The 1921 Denver Pioneers football team was an American football team that represented the University of Denver as a member of the Rocky Mountain Conference (RMC) during the 1921 college football season. In their second season under head coach Fred J. Murphy, the Pioneers compiled a 4–2–1 record (2–2–1 against conference opponents), tied for fourth place in the RMC, and outscored opponents by a total of 133 to 78.

Schedule

References

Denver
Denver Pioneers football seasons
Denver Pioneers football